Hi-5 House is an Australian children's television series, a spin-off of the original Hi-5 series, which aired on the Nine Network in Australia from 1999 to 2011, created by Helena Harris and Posie Graeme-Evans. The series stars the children’s musical group Hi-5, with the spin-off being created to continue the concept with a refreshed appeal, after the brand was sold by the Nine Network in 2012. The program is known for its musical and educational content. Hi-5 House premiered on 4 November 2013 on Nick Jr. Australia.

The series is designed for a pre-school audience, featuring five performers who educate and entertain through music, movement and play. Music is an integral part of the series with the group's pop appeal resonating in the program. The segments of the show are based on an educational model. Julie Greene served as the executive producer for the program, having previously worked as a series producer on the original show. The cast is composed of Lauren Brant, Mary Lascaris, Ainsley Melham, Stevie Nicholson and Dayen Zheng. Brant was replaced by Tanika Anderson for the later two series. Hi-5 House received an Asian Television Award for Best Preschool Program in 2015.

The third and final series was made available worldwide on Netflix on 25 March 2016. Hi-5 House concluded as a result of the Nine Network renewing its partnership with the Hi-5 franchise in October 2016 with plans to revive the original program with a new cast in 2017.

Series overview

Episodes

Series 1 (2013)

Series 2 (2014)

Series 3 (2016)

References

Lists of Australian children's television series episodes